India participated in the 1966 Asian Games—The Fifth Asian Games, held in the Bangkok, Thailand from 9 to 20 December 1966. Indian athletes won total 21 medals with 7 golds and ranked fifth in a medal table.

Medals by sport

References

Nations at the 1966 Asian Games
1966
Asian Games